Yankele Hershkowitz was a street singer during the Holocaust in the Łódź Ghetto.

References 

Jewish singers
Łódź Ghetto inmates